Barua Alauddin Dewan High School is a secondary school under Dhaka Education Board located in Khilkhet Thana, Dhaka, on the east side of Shahajalal International Airport. The school was established in 1984. The name of the head master is Md. Gias Uddin. It has 34 teachers and 1000 students, from class Nursery to class Ten.

References

Schools in Dhaka District
High schools in Bangladesh
1984 establishments in Bangladesh
Educational institutions established in 1984